Boursinidia atrimedia is a moth of the family Noctuidae. It is found in Chile (Tierra del Fuego, Rio Mc Clelland, Chaitén, Punta Arenas and Ojo Bueno) and Argentina (Nahuel Huapi, San Martín de los Andes and Bariloche).

The wingspan is about 42 mm. Adults are on wing from November to December.

External links
 Noctuinae of Chile

Noctuinae
Fauna of Argentina
Fauna of Chile
Moths of South America